The Great Rivers Lacrosse Conference (GRLC) was a conference in the Men's Collegiate Lacrosse Association (MCLA). The GRLC incorporated teams in Illinois, Indiana, Kansas, Missouri, Nebraska, and Ohio and was divided into two divisions, Division I and Division II.

History
The conference was formed in 2002 after teams in the southwestern region of the Central Collegiate Lacrosse Association separated to form the Great Rivers Lacrosse Conference.

In 2017, it was announced that the GRLC would be dissolved as an MCLA Conference. Illinois, Illinois State, Indiana, Kansas, Missouri, Nebraska and Purdue were all moved to the Upper Midwest Lacrosse Conference (UMLC), while Creighton, Kansas State, Missouri State, Missouri S&T, Saint Louis, Southern Illinois and Washington University in St. Louis were moved to the Lone Star Alliance (LSA).

Teams
GRLC Teams were split into two Divisions with the top programs and larger schools in Division I and smaller schools and programs in Division II. There were 9 members in Division I and 7 members in Division II.

Conference Champions

References

External links
GRLC website
Official MCLA website

College lacrosse leagues in the United States